Á Bao A Qu (Malay) – Entity that lives in the Tower of Victory in Chitor.
 Aatxe (Basque) – Bull spirit.
 Abaasy (Yakuts) – Iron-toothed demons.
 Abada (African) – Unicorn that inhabits the African Congo.
 Äbädä (Tatar) – Forest spirit.
 Abaia (Melanesia) – Huge magical eel.
 Abarimon (Medieval Bestiaries) – Savage humanoid with backward feet.
 Abath (Malay) – One-horned animal.
 Abura-sumashi (Japanese) – Creature from a mountain pass in Kumamoto Prefecture.
 Acephali (Greek) – Headless humanoids.
 Acheri (Hindu) – Disease-bringing ghost.
 Achiyalabopa (Pueblo) – Huge bird god.
 Achlis (Roman) – Curious elk.
 Adar Llwch Gwin (Welsh) – Giant birds that understand human languages.
 Adaro (Solomon Islands) – Malevolent merfolk.
 Adhene (Manx) – Nature spirit.
 Adlet (Inuit) – Vampiric dog-human hybrid
 Adroanzi (Lugbara) – Nature spirit.
 Adze (Ewe people) – African vampiric-forest being.
 Aerico (Greek) – Disease demon.
 Æsir (Norse) – Norse deities.
 Afanc (Welsh) – Lake monster (exact lake varies by story).
 Agni (Hindu) – God of fire and sacrifices. 
 Agathodaemon (Greek) – Spirit of vinefields and grainfields.
 Agloolik (Inuit) – Ice spirit that aids hunters and fishermen.
 Agogwe (East Africa) – Small, ape-like humanoid.
 Ahkiyyini (Inuit) – Animated skeleton that causes shipwrecks.
 Ahuizotl (Aztec) – Anthropophagous dog-monkey hybrid.
 Ahura (Zoroastrianism) – Zoroastrian spirits.
 Aigamuxa (Khoikhoi) – Anthropophagous humanoid with eyes in its instep.
 Aigikampoi (Etruscan) – Fish-tailed goat.
 Airavata (Hindu) – Divine elephant.
 Aitu (Polynesian) – Malevolent spirits or demons.
 Aitvaras (Lithuanian) – Household spirit.
 Ajatar (Finnish) – Dragon/snake female spirit, is said to spread diseases
 Akateko (Japanese) – Tree-dwelling monster.
 Akhlut (Inuit) – Orca-wolf shapeshifter.
 Akka (Finnish) – Female spirits or minor goddesses.
 Akki (Japanese) – Large, grotesque humanoid.
 Akkorokamui (Ainu) – Sea monster.
 Akuma (Japanese) – Evil spirit or devil
 Akupara (Hindu) – Giant turtle that supports the world.
 Akurojin-no-hi (Japanese) – Ghostly flame which causes disease.
 Al (Armenian and Persian) – Spirit that steals unborn babies and livers from pregnant women.
 Ala (Slavic) – Bad weather demon.
 Alal (Chaldean) – Queen of the full moon.
 Alan (Philippine) – Winged humanoid that steals reproductive waste to make children.
 Alce (Heraldic) – Wingless griffin.
 Aleya (Bengali) – Spirit of a dead fisherman.
 Alicanto (Chilean) – Bird that eats gold and silver.
 Alicorn (Bestiario medieval) – Winged unicorn.
 Alkonost (Slavic) – Angelic bird with human head and breasts.
 Allocamelus (Heraldic) – Ass-camel hybrid.
 Almas (Mongolian) – Savage humanoid.
 Al-mi'raj (Islamic) – One-horned rabbit.
 Aloja (Catalan) – Female water spirit.
 Alom-bag-winno-sis (Abenaki) – Little people and tricksters.
 Alp (German) – Male night-demon.
 Alphyn (Heraldic) – Lion-like creature, sometimes with dragon or goat forelegs.
 Alp-luachra (Irish) – Parasitic fairy.
 Al Rakim (Islamic) – Guard dog of the Seven Sleepers.
 Alseid (Greek) – Grove nymph.
 Alû (Assyrian) – Leprous demon.
 Alux (Mayan) – Little people.
 Amaburakosagi (Japanese) – Ritual disciplinary demon from Shikoku.
 Amala (Tsimshian) – Giant who holds up the world.
 Amamehagi (Japanese) – Ritual disciplinary demon from Hokuriku.
 Amanojaku (Japanese) – Small demon.
 Amarok (Inuit) – Giant wolf.
 Amarum (Quechua) – Water boa spirit.
 Amazake-babaa (Japanese) – Disease-causing hag.
 Amemasu (Ainu) – Lake monster.
 Ammit  (Ancient Egyptian) – Female demon who was part lion, hippopotamus and crocodile and devoured the souls of the wicked.
 Amorōnagu (Japanese) – Tennyo from the island of Amami Ōshima.
 Amphiptere (Heraldic) – Winged serpent.
 Amphisbaena (Greek) – Serpent with a head at each end.
 Anak (Jewish) – Giant.
 Androsphinx (Ancient Egyptian) – Human-headed sphinx.
 Angel (mainly Christian, Jewish, Islamic traditions) – Divine beings of Heaven who act as mediators between God and humans; the counterparts of Demons.
 Anqa (Arabian) – Giant mythical female bird similar to a phoenix.
 Ani Hyuntikwalaski (Cherokee) – Lightning spirit.
 Ankou (French) – Skeletal grave watcher with a lantern and scythe.
 Anmo (Japanese) – Ritual disciplinary demon from Iwate Prefecture.
 Antaeus (Greek) – Giant who was extremely strong as long as he remained in contact with the ground.
 Anubis (Ancient Egyptian) – God of the Underworld
 Antero Vipunen (Finnish) – Subterranean giant.
 Anzû (Sumerian) – Divine storm bird
 Ao Ao (Guaraní) – Anthropophagous peccary or sheep.
 Aobōzu (Japanese) – Blue monk who kidnaps children.
 Apkallu (Sumerian) – Fish-human hybrid that attends the god Enki.
 Apsaras (Buddhist and Hindu) – Female cloud spirit.
 Aqrabuamelu (Akkadian) – Human-scorpion hybrid.
 Ardat-Lili (Akkadian) – Disease demon.
 Argus Panoptes (Greek) – Hundred-eyed giant.
 Arikura-no-baba (Japanese) – Old woman with magical powers.
 Arimaspi (Greek) – One-eyed humanoid.
 Arion (Greek) – Swift green-maned talking horse.
 Arkan Sonney (Manx) – Fairy hedgehog.
 Asag (Sumerian) – Hideous rock demon.
 Asakku (Sumerian) – Demon.
 Asanbosam (West Africa) – Iron-toothed vampire.
 Asena (Turkic) – Blue-maned wolf.
 A-senee-ki-wakw (Abenaki) – Stone giant.
 Ashi-magari (Japanese) – Invisible tendril that impedes movement.
 Asiman (Dahomey) – Vampiric possession spirit.
 Askefrue (Germanic) – Female tree spirit.
 Ask-wee-da-eed (Abenaki) – Fire elemental and spectral fire.
 Asobibi (Japanese) – Spectral fire from Kōchi Prefecture.
 Aspidochelone (Medieval Bestiaries) – Island-sized whale or sea turtle.
 Asrai (English) – Water spirit.
 Astomi (Greek) – Humanoid sustained by pleasant smells instead of food.
 Asura (Hindu) – Hindu malevolent divinities.
 Aswang (Philippine) – Carrion-eating humanoid.
 Atomy (English) – Surprisingly small creature.
 Ato-oi-kozō (Japanese) – Invisible spirit that follows people.
 Atshen (Inuit) – Anthropophagous spirit.
 Augerino (American) -  Subterranean creature.
 Auloniad (Greek) – Pasture nymph.
 Auvekoejak (Inuit) – Furry merman.
 Avalerion (Medieval Bestiary) – King of the birds.
 Awa-hon-do (Abenaki) – Insect spirit.
 Axex (Ancient Egyptian) – Falcon-lion hybrid.
 Ayakashi (Japanese) – Sea serpent that travels over boats in an arc while dripping oil.
 Ayakashi-no-ayashibi (Japanese) – Spectral fire from Ishikawa Prefecture.
 Aziza (Dahomey) – Little people that help hunters.
 Azukiarai/Azukitogi (Japanese) – Spirit that washes azuki beans along riversides.
 Azukibabaa (Japanese) – Bean-grinding hag who devours people.

A